John Eyres (20 March 1899 – 2 October 1975) was an English footballer who played in the Football League for Bristol Rovers, Brighton & Hove Albion, Walsall, York City and Stoke City.

Career
Eyres was associated with Stoke for a period of seven years without really establishing himself in the first team. He had spells with Nantwich Town and Witton Albion before joining Stoke in 1922. His best season in red and white came in 1926–27 which saw Eyres score 12 goals helping Stoke win the Football League Third Division North title. After scoring on average a goal every three games for the "Potters" he was transferred to Walsall in 1929 for a small fee. He did well for the "Saddlers" scoring 37 goals in 89 matches in two seasons. He then spent a season at Brighton & Hove Albion, two at Bristol Rovers and ended his career with York City and non-league Gainsborough Trinity.

Career statistics
Source:

Honours
Stoke City
 Football League Third Division North: 1926–27

References

1899 births
Sportspeople from Northwich
1975 deaths
English footballers
Association football forwards
Nantwich Town F.C. players
Witton Albion F.C. players
Stoke City F.C. players
Walsall F.C. players
Brighton & Hove Albion F.C. players
Bristol Rovers F.C. players
York City F.C. players
Gainsborough Trinity F.C. players
English Football League players